The Yeni Mosque (from , "New Mosque") is a historical Ottoman mosque in Mytilene on the island of Lesbos in Greece.

Location 
The mosque is on Ermou street in Epano Skala, the old Turkish neighborhood of Mytilene, at the center of the old Turkish market. Epano Skala is located to the north of the modern city center and west of the old harbor.

History and architecture 
Lesbos was under Ottoman rule between 1462-1912 and had a considerable Muslim population. The mosque was commissioned by the local governor (nazır), Kulaksızzade Mustafa Ağa, ca. 1825. In addition, a medrese (Muslim monastery) commissioned by Hacı Muhammed was built in the yard of the mosque, while the mufti's residence was built on the northern side of the yard. The structure is built of stone, with a brick domed roof, combining elements of Byzantine and Ottoman architecture.

After the population exchange between Greece and Turkey in the early 1920s, the Turkish population left the city and the mosque lost its community. Although the mosque was neglected for the remaining years, 35 volunteers, members of Aeolistas civil initiative group, cleaned the mosque in 2011. Presently, mayor Spiros Galinos promises to restore the mosque by using EU funds.

See also 
 Islam in Greece
 List of mosques in Greece

References

External links 
 

19th-century mosques
19th-century architecture in Greece
Buildings and structures completed in 1825
Buildings and structures in Mytilene
Buildings and structures of the Ottoman Empire
Former mosques in Greece
Ottoman mosques in Greece